The order Polypodiales encompasses the major lineages of polypod ferns, which comprise more than 80% of today's fern species. They are found in many parts of the world including tropical, semitropical and temperate areas.

Description
Polypodiales are unique in bearing sporangia with a vertical annulus interrupted by the stalk and stomium. These sporangial characters were used by Johann Jakob Bernhardi to define a group of ferns he called the "Cathetogyratae"; the Pteridophyte Phylogeny Group has suggested reviving this name as the informal term cathetogyrates, to replace the ambiguously circumscribed term "polypods" when referring to the Polypodiales. The sporangia are born on stalks 1–3 cells thick and are often long-stalked. (In contrast, the Hymenophyllales have a stalk composed of four rows of cells.) The sporangia do not reach maturity simultaneously. Many groups in the order lack indusia, but when present, they are attached either along the edge of the indusium or in its center.

Both Polypodiales and Cyatheales differ from other ferns in having a photoreceptor called a neochrome, which allows them to perform photosynthesis better in low-light conditions, such as in the shadows on the forest floor. The common ancestor of the two groups appears to have derived the neochrome via horizontal gene transfer from a hornwort.

Their gametophytes are green, usually heart-shaped, and grow at the surface (rather than underground, as in Ophioglossales).

Taxonomy
The order Polypodiales was first described by Link in 1833. The circumscription of the order has changed over time as ferns have been classified in many different ways (see the review by Christenhusz and Chase, 2014). Smith et al. (2006) carried out the first higher-level pteridophyte classification published in the molecular phylogenetic era. They referred to the ferns (now including horsetails) as monilophytes, dividing them into four groups, with the vast majority of species being placed in a taxon they called "Polypodiopsida". The four-fold grouping has persisted through subsequent systems, despite changes in nomenclature. Polypodiopsida is now used for all ferns (sensu lato), with Smith et al.'s group being subclass Polypodiidae. This group, which includes Polypodiales, is also informally known as the leptosporangiate ferns, while the remaining three groups (subclasses) are referred to as eusporangiate ferns. The Polypodiidae have been divided into seven orders, Polypodiales being the largest. The phylogenetic position of Polypodiales in relation to the other orders of Polypodiidae is shown in the following cladogram.

Subdivision 
The division of the Polypodiales into families has changed somewhat between the pioneering work of Smith et al. (2006) and the Pteridophyte Phylogeny Group's classification of 2016, with a general increase in the number of divisions recognized, albeit sometimes at different ranks. The table below summarizes four systems; families are listed alphabetically within three broad groups. Although the same families are used in more than one system, circumscriptions may differ. Christenhusz and Chase in 2014 used a very broad circumscription of Aspleniaceae and Polypodiaceae, reducing families used in other systems to subfamilies.

Smith et al. (2006) divided the Polypodiales into fifteen families, a practice continued in their 2008 revision, with members of the eupolypods placed in two unranked clades. The families are listed in the table. While many of these families had previously been recognized with similar circumscriptions, the authors noted that Dryopteridaceae was more narrowly bounded than in historical circumscriptions, which had included their Tectariaceae, Onocleaceae and Woodsiaceae. The circumscription of Lomariopsidaceae changed dramatically, with most historical genera of that family (except Lomariopsis and Thysanosoria) being moved to Dryopteridaceae, while Cyclopeltis and Nephrolepis were added. Saccolomataceae were removed from the dennstaedtioids. Cystodium was tentatively placed in Lindsaeaceae, away from its historical position with the tree ferns. Woodsiaceae was acknowledged to be of uncertain circumscription and perhaps paraphyletic; the inclusion of Hypodematium, Didymochlaena, and Leucostegia perhaps also rendering Dryopteridaceae paraphyletic. The grammitids were included in Polypodiaceae to render that family monophyletic.

The linear sequence of Christenhusz et al. (2011), intended for compatibility with the classification of Chase and Reveal (2009), incorporated new phylogenetic evidence to make several changes at the familial level, resulting in an expansion to 23 families. Lonchitis and Cystodium were removed from the Lindsaeaceae and incorporated into new families, Lonchitidaceae and Cystodiaceae respectively. Within eupolypods I, Woodsiaceae proved to be paraphyletic and was reduced to the genera Cheilanthopsis, Hymenocystis, and Woodsia, while the remainder of its genera were removed to Cystopteridaceae, Diplaziopsidaceae, Rhachidosoraceae, Athyriaceae, and Hemidictyaceae. Within eupolypods II, Nephrolepis was placed in a new family, the Nephrolepidaceae, due to uncertainty in its phylogenetic placement, while Hypodematiaceae was split from Dryopteridaceae to contain the three problematic genera mentioned by Smith et al.

The classification of Christenhusz and Chase (2014) dramatically reduced the number of families recognized in this order to eight by "lumping", reducing many families to subfamilies and expanding the circumscription of Polypodiaceae and Aspleniaceae to encompass all of eupolypods I and eupolypods II, respectively. Former families became subfamilies (see the table above). The former Hemidictyaceae were included in the Asplenioideae, and the Onocleaceae in the Blechnoideae. In the new Polypodiaceae, Didymochlaena was placed in its own subfamily, Didymochlaenoideae.

The PPG I classification (2016) used a process intermediate between the two previous approaches, by introducing a new rank, that of suborder, and organising 26 families (in some cases very narrowly circumscribed) into six suborders, largely returning to the families set out by Christenhusz et al. in 2011. In lieu of the expansion of Aspleniaceae and Polypodiaceae, eupolypods I and II were recognized and named as suborders:
Saccolomatineae includes the single family Saccolomataceae.
Lindsaeinae corresponds to the Lindseaceae of Smith et al., and includes the Cystodiaceae, Lindsaeaceae, and Lonchitidaceae. It is probably not monophyletic.
Pteridineae includes the single family Pteridaceae.
Dennstaedtiineae includes the single family Dennstaedtiaceae.
Aspleniinae (formerly eupolypods I) includes the families Cystopteridaceae, Rhachidosoraceae, Diplaziopsidaceae, Desmophlebiaceae (containing only Desmophlebium), Hemidictyaceae, Aspleniaceae, Woodsiaceae, Onocleaceae, Blechnaceae, Athyriaceae, and Thelypteridaceae.
Polypodiineae (formerly eupolypods II) includes the families Didymochlaenaceae (containing only Didymochlaena), Hypodematiaceae, Dryopteridaceae, Lomariopsidaceae, Nephrolepidaceae, Tectariaceae, Oleandraceae, Davalliaceae, and Polypodiaceae.

Phylogeny

Obsolete families
Now-obsolete families of Polypodiales include:
 Drynariaceae - now in Polypodiaceae
 Grammitidaceae - now in Polypodiaceae
 Gymnogrammitidaceae - now in Polypodiaceae
 Loxogrammaceae - now in Polypodiaceae
 Platyceriaceae - now in Polypodiaceae
 Pleursoriopsidaceae - now in Polypodiaceae
 Vittariaceae - now in Pteridaceae

Evolution 

Polypodiales may be regarded as one of the most evolutionarily advanced orders of monilophytes (ferns), based on recent genetic analysis. They arose and diversified about 100 million years ago, probably subsequent to the diversification of the angiosperms.

References

Bibliography

 
 
 
 
 
 
 
 
 
 
 
 
 , in 
 
 Eric Schuettpelz. The evolution and diversification of epiphytic ferns. PhD Thesis Duke University 2007
 Michael Hassler and Brian Swale. Checklist of Ferns and Fern Allies 2001
 Australian National Botanic Gardens. A classification of the ferns and their allies

 
Fern orders